The Congress of Aguascalientes (Spanish: Congreso de Aguascalientes) or by your full name Congress of the Free and Sovereign State of Aguascalientes (Congreso del Estado Libre y Soberano de Aguascalientes) is the depository body of the legislative power of the Mexican state of Aguascalientes, It is a unicameral assembly made up of twenty-seven deputies, of whom eighteen are elected by relative majority and nine by proportional representation.

References

External links 
 Congress of Aguascalientes official webpage

Aguascalientes, Congress of
Government of Aguascalientes